Selar is a genus of ray-finned fishes from the family Carangidae which includes the scads, jacks, pompanos, trevallies and horse mackerels. The generic name, Selar, is the local name for the oxeye scad in Jakarta.

Species
There are currently two recognized species in this genus:

References

 
Caranginae
Taxa named by Pieter Bleeker
Marine fish genera